MacDonell, Macdonell, or McDonell is a surname of Scottish origin. It is an anglicized form of the Gaelic patronymic Mac Dhòmhnaill, meaning "son of Dòmhnall". The personal name Dòmhnall is composed of the elements domno "world" and val "might", "rule". The name is a variation of other Clan Donald surnames such as MacDonald and Donaldson. 

Notable people with the surname include:

A. G. Macdonell (1895–1941), Scottish writer, journalist, and broadcaster
Alasdair Ranaldson MacDonell of Glengarry (1771–1828), chief of the Clan MacDonnel of Glengarry
Alexander Macdonell (1762–1840), Canadian Roman Catholic bishop
Alexander Macdonell (1762–1842), Canadian soldier and political figure
Alexander McDonell (1786–1861), Scottish-Canadian immigration agent and political figure
Angus Claude Macdonell (1861–1924), Canadian lawyer and politician
Angus MacDonell (1751–1817), Scottish-Canadian soldier and political figure
Angus Macdonell (d. 1804), Scottish-Canadian lawyer and political figure
Archibald Hayes Macdonell (1868–1939), Canadian soldier and politician
Arthur Anthony Macdonell (1854–1930), British Sanskrit scholar
Brian MacDonell (b. 1935), New Zealand politician
Donald Aeneas MacDonell (1794–1879), Canadian soldier and politician
Donald Macdonell (Upper Canada politician) (1778–1861), Scottish-Canadian politician
Hugh McDonell (died 1833), Scottish-Canadian soldier and politician
Sir Hugh MacDonell (1832–1904), British diplomat
James Macdonell (1841–1879), Scottish journalist
John Alexander MacDonell (1854–1912), Canadian politician
John MacDonell (contemporary), Canadian politician from Nova Scotia
John MacDonell (1728–1810), Scottish-Canadian military man and colonist
John MacDonell (b. 1966), Canadian lawyer and politician from Nova Scotia
John Macdonell (1785–1812), Scottish-Canadian aide-de-camp to British Major General Isaac Brock during the War of 1812
John McDonell (1768–1850), Scottish-Canadian soldier, judge and political figure
John McDonell (1758–1809), Canadian soldier, judge, and political figure
Miles Macdonell (1767–1828), Scottish-Canadian military man and colonist
Nick McDonell (b. 1984), American writer
Philip James Macdonell, (1873-1940), British Colonial judge
Terry McDonell (b. 1944), American journalist and editor
William Andrew Macdonell (1853–1920), Canadian Roman Catholic bishop
Scottish clan
Clan MacDonell of Glengarry
Clan MacDonell of Keppoch

Anglicised Scottish Gaelic-language surnames
Patronymic surnames
Surnames from given names